Faqir Qadir Bux Bedil (‎) (1815–1873) better known by his pen name Bedil (one bereft of heart) was a Sufi poet and scholar of great stature. After Shah Abdul Latif Bhittai and Sachal Sarmast, two stars that shone on the firmament of Sindhi poetry and who could measure up to them in excellence were the father and son – Bedil and Bekas. They wrote poetry in Saraiki Sindhi and Persian.

Early life
Bedil was born to a very pious family of Rohri. His father Khalifa Muhammad Mohsun was a disciple of Sayed Mir Janullah Shah Rizwi who was a great saint of his time, highly venerated and was chief of forty cardinals of Sufi Shah Inayat Shaheed of Jhok Shareef. Thus Bedil was brought up in such an enlightened environment under the guidance of Mir Sahib.

It is narrated in the book Diwan-e-Bedil by Abdul Hussain Musavi that the midwife came and announced the news of the birth of a child to father who was sitting in the gathering with Sufi Januallah Shah. She said, "You have been blessed with a child but alas, his one foot is physically twisted." Upon hearing this father said," He is not physically handicapped by one foot. In fact, he is the flag of Rohri city." His father's statement proved true many years later. On his birth, he was named Abdul Qadir but he preferred to be called Qadir Bux.

He was a staunch Muslim who molded his life strictly according to Shariah law. He was very simple and frugal in his lifestyle and gave away whatever he received to the needy. He followed the path of Ishq-e-Majazi (platonic love) to attain the heights of Ishq-e-Haqiqi (spiritual love) as dictated by Mystic doctrine. He was a devotee of Lal Shahbaz Qalandar of Sehwan. Although he had a deformity in one foot, yet he undertook long journeys to Sehwan to pay homage to the Saint's Shrine. He went to Jhok Sharif to pay homage to shrine of Sufi Shah Inayat Shaheed and to Daraza, to visit the shrine of Sachal Sarmast.

Works

Bedil was the most voluminous poet of Sindh, even more so than Shah Latif, with 10 books of poetry to his credit. Most of his poems were written in Persian, Seraiki, Sindhi, Arabic, and Urdu,. His famous Sindhi works were Wahdat Namo (Book of Union) and Surood Namo (Book of Melody). He compiled as many as 23 books on prose and poetry written in Persian, Sindhi, Saraiki, and Urdu: the more known being:

Masanavi Riyaz-ul-faqr
Diwan-e-Sulook-ul-Talbin
Diwan Minhaj-ul-Haqiqat
Rumuz-ul-Qadri
Masanavi Nahr-ul-Bahr
Punj Gunj
Diwan Musbah-ul-Tariqat
Wahadat Namo
Sarood Namo
Diwan-e-Bedil(Sindhi)
Masnavi Dilkusha
Diwan-e-Bedil (Farsi)
Fe Batn Ahadees
Taqwiyat-ul-Quloob
Zahoor Nama
Qurat-ul-Ain Fe Manaqib-ul-Sibtain
Insha-e-Qadri
Tarikhai Wafat
Khutbat-e-Juma
Fawaid-e-Manavi 
Kursi Nama
Ramooz-ul-Arfin
Diwan-e-Bedil (Farsi)

Scholar Nabi Bux Khan Baloch has termed Fakir Qadir Bux Bedil as the last Sufi saint who wrote on Tasawuf and history of Sindh and taught mysticism through his poetry. Wahadat Namo is a thought-provoking work through which Bedil Fakir has presented the essence of Sufism (mysticism). Bedil was the first scholar who wrote the history of Jhok Sharif and the sacrifice of Sufi Shah Inayat Shaheed of Sindh.

Poetry
Among his poetic compositions, we have his famous elegy, written on the death of Sachal Sarmast immortalising the master and incidentally himself too. Some of the verses from this elegy are:

Translation of some verses 

The one whom you seek after,

Is none but your own self.

If you recognise yourself,

Then none other exists.

This and that are same,

Just like voice, sound and echo.

Bedil! let it not slip from thy hands,

The trade of unitive state,

O' traveler of Sufi path! this thought is profitable.
O Bedil leave good and evil,

Go and seek divine love.

Divine love came; reasoning taken away, loads of miseries befell on me,

Heard of pain and separation, likewise agony came in my chest,

Bedil sans love, living in this world is meaningless.

Except Him, whatever (I) understood, 

O Bedil! love made me forget.

Die before you die,

Then you, O Brave, turn into real Muslim.

Your love is treasure,

Every breath is a special jewel,

Believe it O brave man,

Make the trade of unity,

Achieve the status of self-annihilation,

Eat the fruits of eternity,

With your eyes shall behold every moment,

The exhibition of celestial light.

While standing, sitting, talking or listening,

Keep this remembrance in your body,

Clean the mirror with this (mirror-cleaning) solution.

Urs

His annual Melo or Urs (death anniversary celebration) is held at his shrine (Dargah) in Rohri on the 14, 15, 16 Dhu al-Qi'dah – the eleventh month of the Muslim calendar where thousands of his Murids (disciples) throng to pay homage to the great saint-poet.

See also
Sufism in Sindh

References

External links

Sindhi-language poets
Sufi poets
Sindhi people
People from British India
Sufism in Sindh
Sindhi Sufi saints
People from Sukkur District
People from Shikarpur District
Punjabi-language poets
1814 births
1873 deaths
19th-century poets